Upper Paeania or Paiania Kathyperthen was a deme of ancient Attica; it was located on the eastern side of Hymettus. One of two demoi named Paeania.

The site of Upper Paeania is located north of modern Liopesi.

References

Populated places in ancient Attica
Former populated places in Greece
Demoi